John Randal Hildebrand Jr. (born January 3, 1988) is an American race car driver. He currently competes in the IndyCar Series driving part-time in the No. 11 Chevrolet for AJ Foyt Enterprises. Hildebrand won the 2009 Indy Lights championship and came close to winning the 2011 Indianapolis 500, hitting the wall on the final corner of the race and crossing the line in second place.

Early career
At the age of 14, Hildebrand started racing go karts in the Jim Russell Arrive and Drive Championship at Infineon Raceway in Northern California; winning not only his first race but the championship that year. In 2003, he raced in the Jr. 80cc Shifter class finishing a close second, and at the end of that year made the transition from karts to cars by winning the Jim Russell Graduate Runoffs; racing in Formula Russell in 2004. That year, he went on to win the series championship; also participating in the Red Bull Driver Search. He then moved up to Pacific F2000 in 2005; finishing second overall as rookie of the year, also being chosen for the Team USA Scholarship, earning him a ride in the Formula Palmer Audi Autumn Trophy, in which he finished third. In 2006, he dominated the U.S. F2000 National Championship; winning the championship and 12 out of 14 races.

In recognition of his impressive 2006 performance, Hildebrand won the Gorsline Scholarship and was elected to the AARWBA All American Auto Racing First Team.

Atlantics and Indy Lights
For 2007, he moved to the Champ Car Atlantic series, driving for Newman Wachs Racing. He finished seventh in points and was the top US rookie in the series. After the season's conclusion he made 2 starts for RLR-Andersen Racing in the Indy Pro Series. Hildebrand then went on to contest the entire series schedule, which was renamed the Firestone Indy Lights Series, for RLR-Andersen in 2008. He captured his first series win in the fourth race of the season at Kansas Speedway, his second start on an oval. He finished 5th overall in the 2008 championship.

For the 2009 season he signed with defending championship-winning team AGR-AFS Racing, and after winning four races and taking five pole positions, he eventually claimed the title at the penultimate round at Chicagoland. That year he also competed in the final round of the A1 Grand Prix series for A1 Team USA at Brands Hatch, finishing 4th in the Sprint race. He was again elected to the AARWBA All American Auto Racing First Team for 2009.

American Le Mans Series
American Le Mans Series' Genoa Racing signed Hildebrand to race an LMPC class car for 2010.  He contested the 12 Hours of Sebring and the Long Beach Grand Prix.

Formula One
Hildebrand spent three days testing for the Force India Formula One team in December 2009, at the Jerez circuit, in a car shared with Paul di Resta.

IndyCar

Hildebrand made his IndyCar Series debut in 2010, competing in two races for Dreyer & Reinbold Racing as a substitute driver for the injured Mike Conway. On Tuesday, December 14, 2010, it was announced that Hildebrand signed a multi–year contract to drive the No. 4 National Guard entry for Panther Racing, starting in 2011 after impressing the team during a test.

Later in 2011, Hildebrand qualified for the Indianapolis 500 and was the most successful rookie during his premiere race. Hildebrand was able to lead at the halfway point for Panther Racing and stayed on the lead lap for the entire race. This allowed him to take a gamble during his last pit stop, stretching out his fuel load to an eventual lead on the final lap. On the very last turn, he slid out of the racing lane and into the retaining wall while passing rapidly slowing Charlie Kimball, allowing Dan Wheldon to take the victory.  Despite the damage to his car – including the loss of a wheel – Hildebrand retained enough speed to cross the finish line in second place.

On October 16, 2011, Hildebrand was involved in a 15-car chain-reaction crash at Las Vegas Motor Speedway in the season-ending IZOD IndyCar World Championships. He sustained an injured sternum and was transported by ground ambulance to a Las Vegas area hospital, where he was admitted for treatment.   The crash claimed the life of two-time Indy 500 winner and 2005 IndyCar Series champion Dan Wheldon.

Following a last-place finish in the 2013 Indianapolis 500, Hildebrand was released by Panther Racing. He had announced earlier in the year that he would be running selected Formula DRIFT races as a teammate to Tyler McQuarrie.

In 2014, Hildebrand joined Ed Carpenter Racing for the Indianapolis 500, driving the No. 21. 
On November 4, 2016, it was confirmed that Hildebrand would take over the Ed Carpenter Racing No. 21 car for the 2017 season, replacing Josef Newgarden. He finished 15th in the points standing for the season, achieving a second-place finish in Iowa and a third in Phoenix. Following the season Hildebrand was not retained by the team.

For 2018 Hildebrand was signed for by Dreyer & Reinbold Racing to pilot their car in the Indy 500 (their only entry of the season) and finished 11th. He returned in the same role in 2019, finishing 20th. He again returned in 2020 for the same one-race role, despite the team's increased commitment to a part-time schedule. He finished in 16th.

In 2021 Hildebrand drove a specially liveried car for A.J. Foyt Enterprises, commemorating the 60th anniversary of team owner A.J. Foyt's first of four Indianapolis 500 wins.  He finished in 15th place.

Pikes Peak Hillclimb
In 2018, Hildebrand competed in the Pikes Peak Hillclimb, driving a Porsche Cayman GT4 Clubsport, finishing 2nd in Porsche Trophy category behind Travis Pastrana.

In 2021 it was quietly announced Hildebrand would compete in the Open Wheel Class, driving a 2021 Dallara DW12/IR18 IndyCar.  That effort fell through due to numerous technicalities which could not be overcome in time to compete.

On February 1, 2022, it was announced Hildebrand had entered the 2022 running of the event, competing in the Open Wheel Class, driving a 2022 Dallara IR18 Evo IndyCar.  While not an IndyCar sanctioned event, all of the IndyCar suppliers are involved in it, as well as chassis manufacturer Dallara.

Personal
In 2006, Hildebrand graduated from Redwood High School in Larkspur, California as a National Merit Scholar. While in high school, he also played varsity baseball. He applied and was accepted by several top universities, including the University of California Los Angeles (UCLA), Berkeley, and the Massachusetts Institute of Technology (MIT). MIT granted a three-year deferral, but he eventually allowed it to lapse as he continued to pursue his racing career.

Racing record

American open–wheel racing results
(key)

USF2000 National Championship

Atlantic Championship

Indy Lights

IndyCar Series

* Season still in progress.

 1 Race cancelled due to death of Dan Wheldon

 ** Podium (non-win) indicates 2nd or 3rd place finishes.
 *** Top 10s (non-podium) indicates 4th through 10th place finishes.

Indianapolis 500

Complete American Le Mans Series results

Pikes Peak International Hill Climb

American rallycross racing results

Complete Americas Rallycross results
(key)

Complete WeatherTech SportsCar Championship results
(key) (Races in bold indicate pole position; races in italics indicate fastest lap)

References

External links
Official Website
IndyCar Driver Page
IndyCar 36: JR Hildebrand – IndyCar documentary

1988 births
A1 Team USA drivers
American Le Mans Series drivers
Atlantic Championship drivers
Drifting drivers
Formula D drivers
Formula Palmer Audi drivers
Indianapolis 500 drivers
Indianapolis 500 Rookies of the Year
Indy Lights champions
Indy Lights drivers
IndyCar Series drivers
Living people
People from Sausalito, California
Racing drivers from California
Sportspeople from the San Francisco Bay Area
U.S. F2000 National Championship drivers
WeatherTech SportsCar Championship drivers
24 Hours of Daytona drivers
Newman Wachs Racing drivers
AFS Racing drivers
Dreyer & Reinbold Racing drivers
Panther Racing drivers
Ed Carpenter Racing drivers
A. J. Foyt Enterprises drivers
Bryan Herta Autosport drivers
Rahal Letterman Lanigan Racing drivers
Andretti Autosport drivers